The spouse of the president of Estonia is the wife or husband of the president of Estonia. Estonia's current president's spouse is Sirje Karis, wife of president Alar Karis.

Spouses of presidents of Estonia

See also
President of Estonia

References 

Politics of Estonia
Presidents of Estonia
Estonia